The Ministry of Health (MOH; ;) is a ministry of the Government of Singapore responsible for managing the public healthcare system in Singapore.

Statutory boards

 Health Promotion Board
 Health Sciences Authority
 Singapore Dental Council
 Singapore Medical Council
 Singapore Nursing Board
 Singapore Pharmacy Council
 Traditional Chinese Medicine Practitioners Board

Ministers 
The Ministry is headed by the Minister for Health, who is appointed as part of the Cabinet of Singapore. The incumbent minister is Ong Ye Kung from the People's Action Party.

Incidents

HIV data leak 
On 28 January 2019, sensitive information including names, identification numbers, phone numbers, addresses and HIV test results of 12,400 HIV-positive people were leaked online after an ex-Ministry of Health staff, Ler Teck Siang had mishandled the information. The ex-staff, the former head of National Public Health Unit, had access to the information and did not comply with Ministry of Health's security guidelines. Ler downloaded the information on to a personal thumb drive, which his then-boyfriend Mikhy K Farrera Brochez had leaked online subsequently. Minister of Health, Gan Kim Yong, also explained that the information was not announced earlier, in order to safeguard the patients' well-being.

Community Health Assist Scheme computer system error 
On 16 February 2019, the ministry released statement that there was an error in the computer system, managed by NCS, for the Community Health Assist Scheme (CHAS). The error miscalculated the amount of health care subsidies applicants could receive through means-testing their income information. Thus, approximately 1,300 people received lower subsidies and 6,400 people received higher subsidies.

The first discrepancy in a result of a CHAS card holder was detected on 24 September 2018 by MOH. NCS was informed immediately, which then initially attributed the issue to intermittent network connection problems. Between 9 October 2018 and 2 November 2018, another 5 more discrepancy cases were detected and thus leading into a deeper investigation. In November 2018, NCS Pte Ltd traced the cause of the discrepancies to a software version issue used on a server used by the system. The identified issue occurred during a migration of the system to another government data center in September 2018. The software version issue was resolved as a resolution to an unrelated slow performance issue on 10 October 2018. However, incorrect results that were generated between 18 September 2018 and 10 October 2018 remained.

Remedial actions were then carried out by MOH and NCS to assess impact on the affected applicants. MOH would then work with grant scheme administrators and healthcare institutions to follow up with notifications and reimbursement to the affected applicants. MOH reportedly had the intention to recover costs and expenses due to this incident from NCS as allowed in the contract between them.

See also
Healthcare in Singapore

References

External links

Singapore Government Directory Interactive — Ministry of Health

Healthcare in Singapore
Health, Ministry of
Singapore
Ministries established in 1965
1959 establishments in Singapore
Singapore